Neoraja caerulea, also known as the blue ray or blue pygmy skate, is a species of fish in the family Rajidae.

References

caerulea
Fish of Europe
Fish of Iceland
Fish described in 1976
Taxa named by Matthias Stehmann